SRV (known as Smart Resourceful Vibrant) is a co-educational school located in Samayapuram near the city of Trichy in the Indian state of Tamil Nadu. It opened in 2006 and possesses a 50-acre campus. The school comes under the aegis of the Sri Vigneswara Educational Trust, Rasipuram. This school runs under Tamil Nadu State Board Syllabus and is especially noted for securing high marks in Board Exams.

Curriculum 
This school adopts the "Rote learning system" in 11th and 12th grades. This school often conducts programmes for students to improve their moral life. This school follows "CAT (Class Assessment Test)" for Board Exam attending classes. This school also conducts NEET and JEE-Main full time courses affiliated to pinnacle classes Services. The best mathematics teacher of Tamil Nadu Prof. S. John Britto works in this school and he has produced many centums in 12th board public Examinations.

Extra-curricular activities 
 This school publishes SRV Times Monthly Newsletter.
 This school organises a weekly leadership programme for students of higher classes for their career guidance. 
 The school has many associate directors in order to encourage culturals and non-academic activities in students.
 The school encourages the students to participate in all cultural events in and around the city.
 This school also conducts a vibrant leadership program conducted by the HRD (Human Resource Development) Department of the school.

References

Primary schools in Tamil Nadu
High schools and secondary schools in Tamil Nadu
Schools in Tiruchirappalli
Educational institutions established in 2006
2006 establishments in Tamil Nadu